Sarcochilus borealis, commonly known as the small lawyer orchid, is a small epiphytic orchid endemic to Queensland. It has up to six thin but stiff, dark green leaves and up to ten green flowers with a white labellum that has reddish brown markings.

Description
The side lobes are erect and the middle lobe is smaller with a prominent tooth. Flowering occurs between June and December.

Taxonomy and naming
The small lawyer orchid was first formally described in 1939 by William Henry Nicholls who gave it the name Sarcochilus olivaceus var. borealis and published the description in The North Queensland Naturalist. In 1989 David Jones and Mark Clements raised the variety to species status. The specific epithet (borealis) is a Latin word meaning "northern".

Distribution and habitat

References

Endemic orchids of Australia
Orchids of Queensland
Plants described in 1939
borealis